Vanessa Williams (born 1963) is an American actress and singer who was named Miss America in 1984.

Vanessa Williams may also refer to:
Vanessa Estelle Williams (born 1963), American actress known for her role in the drama series Soul Food
Vanessa R. Williams (born 1960), American gospel singer
Vanessa Williams (Sierra Leonean model), Sierra Leonean model and beauty pageant titleholder